William Reed ( – September 1728) was a British colonial official who served as the acting governor of North Carolina from 1722 to 1724.

Biography
Reed was born in 1670 and he probably arrived to North Carolina from England. Reed was appointed as a Proprietor's deputy and member of the Council in 1712, keeping these occupations for the remainder of his life. Reed was appointed Acting Governor of North Carolina on 7 September 1722, keeping the charge until the arrival of Governor Burrington on 15 January 1724, when Reed was appointed president of Council. Several lawsuits against Reed were made (between them, he was accused of sell liquor without licenses at this home, with others men). Reed repeatedly clashed with colonial governors and even wrote an official complaint from the Council about Gov. Richard Everard's administration to King George II that was sent the day after Reed's death. He died on 1728, at his home in Pasquotank County, North Carolina. Reed was married twice: The first of his wife was named Christian, with who had two sons: Christian and Joseph. His second wife was Jane, with who had a son, William.

References

External links

William Reed at Historical Marker Database
William Reed at carolana.com

1670s births
1728 deaths
Deaths in North Carolina
Governors of North-Carolina (1712–1776)
Members of the North-Carolina Provincial Council
People from Camden County, North Carolina
Presidents of the North-Carolina Provincial Council